Herro is a given name and surname. Notable people with the name include:

Herro Mustafa (born 1973), American diplomat
David Herro, American businessman 
Tyler Herro (born 2000), American basketball player

See also
Hero (given name)